The 2008 EagleBank Bowl was the inaugural edition of the new  college football bowl game, and was played at Robert F. Kennedy Memorial Stadium in Washington, DC.  The game, formerly known as the Congressional Bowl before naming rights were purchased by EagleBank, started at 11 AM US EST on Saturday, December 20, 2008, as the first contest of the 2008–09 bowl season. The game, telecast on ESPN, pit the Wake Forest Demon Deacons against the Navy Midshipmen. This was a rematch of a September 27, 2008, game between the two teams that Navy won, 24–17, at Wake Forest. The Demon Deacons got a measure of revenge by winning the game, 29–19.

Scoring summary

References

EagleBank Bowl
Military Bowl
Navy Midshipmen football bowl games
Wake Forest Demon Deacons football bowl games
December 2008 sports events in the United States
2008 in sports in Washington, D.C.